Rigaun or Ree gaun is a village development committee in Dhading District in the Bagmati Zone of central Nepal. At the time of the 1991 Nepal census it had a population of 5218 and had 875 houses in it. Ree Gaun is located in the Northern part of Dhading. It consists of wards no 1 & 2 of Gangajamuna Rural Municipality, State 3, Dhading Nepal. There are 90% people of the Tamang ethnic group, and some are Gurung, Kami (BK), Damai. The main occupation of this area is agriculture.

Village's name list in Ree 

 Tawal Village & Tawal Bensi 
 Dhuseni Village
 Latab Village
 Kutal Village
 Saleri & Teshyapho Village
 Shyaktali Village
 Gangmrang Village
 Ree gaun . Choke Village
 Epi Village Village
 Richet Village
 Tajimrang Village
 Kichet, Annar Cheprang, & Karang Village

Ward no.1
The ward no.1 is combined with 4 local wards.
  Ree gaun
  Choke Village
  Epi Village Village
  Richet Village
  Tajimrang Village
  Kichet Village
  Annar Cheprang
  Karang Village

Ward no.2
There are more than six local villages has been combined in ward no.2 after the new local governance of GRM. 
Latab Village
Dhuseni Village
Tawal Village & Tawal Bensi
Kutal Village
Saleri & Teshyapho Village
Shyaktali Village
Gangmrang Village

Tourist destination
 Longarchet Valley: a place where earthquake victims lived for two years as temporary place.
 Shyanchet Dada
 Pasangchowk
 Palang-Naang

Economy
The main occupation of Ree Gaun is farming. The recent local business here is knitting baskets, selling local products like baskets and meats.

Administration
Ree Gaun VDC consists of two wards.
 Ward 1Office: Tajimrang 
 Ward 2Office: Tawal Mele Dada

Earthquake 2015
In Ree Gaun the earthquake of 2015 killed more than 78 people, and 99% of houses and buildings were completely destroyed.

Rivers
The main river of the Ree is Kutal-Chhumrung Khola which comes from Ganesh Himal and passes through Ringne and Lapang and meets Kutal-Chhumrung Khola separates the Ree and Dark, Jharlang. There are 5 small rivers, the main being Kutal-Chhumrung Khola, Chimchok Khola, Kalshyong Khola, Saleri Khola. Besides these, there are over 10 smaller rivers, springs and seasonal streams.

References

 The Map of Potential Vegetation of Nepal - a forestry/agroecological/biodiversity classification system (PDF), Forest & Landscape Development and Environment Series 2-2005 and CFC-TIS Document Series No.110., 2005, .

External links
 Ree VDC WEBSITE
 Local Governance Gangajamuna Rural Municipality 
 जिल्ला समन्वय समितिको कार्यालय, धादिङ, नेपाल
 Nepal Information Technology Center (NP)
 LOCAL GOVERNANCE AND COMMUNITY DEVELOPMENT PROGRAMME (LGCDP)
 Nepal Law Commission 
 Ministry of Finance Nepal
 राष्ट्रिय योजना आयोग
 Earthquake documentary video of Tawal
 Documentary Video of Longarchet Earthquake Victims Ree Dhading, Nepal

Populated places in Dhading District